Aden Durde (born July 10, 1979) is a former American football linebacker, and is currently the defensive line coach of the Dallas Cowboys. He is also known for being an integral part of the International Player Pathway program.

Professional career
Born in Middlesex, England, Durde began his football career in the United Kingdom with the London Olympians and played for the Scottish Claymores (2003–2004). After leaving the Carolina Panthers, he played for the Hamburg Sea Devils (2005–2007).

Coaching career
On April 11, 2018, the Atlanta Falcons added Durde as their new defensive quality control coach. He previously served as the head of football development at NFLUK, where he helped guide the International Player Pathway program. He also served as the defensive coordinator of the London Warriors for six seasons.

Dallas Cowboys 
On January 20, 2021, the Dallas Cowboys hired Durde as their new defensive line coach, reuniting him with current Cowboys defensive coordinator Dan Quinn, with whom he previously worked for on the Atlanta Falcons coaching staff, where Quinn served as the head coach.

References

1979 births
Living people
American football linebackers
Atlanta Falcons coaches
British American Football League players
Carolina Panthers players
English players of American football
Hamburg Sea Devils players
Kansas City Chiefs players
People from Enfield, London
Scottish Claymores players
Dallas Cowboys coaches
Expatriate players of American football
English expatriate sportspeople in Germany
Sportspeople from London